The Peddler is a 1987 Iranian drama film directed by Mohsen Makhmalbaf. The music was composed by Majid Entezami. The film stars Mahmoud Basiri, Behzad Behzadpour, Zohreh Sarmadi and Esmail Soltanian.

Story
The film is made up of three sketches. One is about an impoverished Tehran couple who already have four disabled children. When the fifth one comes along, they try to have it adopted in the hope it will not suffer the same fate as the others.

Cast
 Mahmoud Basiri
 Behzad Behzadpour
 Zohreh Sarmadi
 Esmail Soltanian
 Morteza Zarrabi
 Moharram Zaynalzadeh

References

External links
 

1980s Persian-language films
1987 films
1987 drama films
Iranian drama films
Films shot in Tehran